The Comanche Solar Project is a 120 megawatt (MWAC) photovoltaic power station  near the city of Pueblo, Colorado.   It became the largest solar facility in the state when it came online in late 2016.   The electricity is being sold to Public Service of Colorado, a subsidiary of Xcel Energy, under a 25-year power purchase agreement (PPA).   Xcel determined through an open bid process that the PPA's terms were competitive with natural gas.

Construction details

The project occupies a total of about 900 acres split into two parcels that are adjacent to the coal-fired Comanche Generating Station; thus providing access to existing high-capacity substation and transmission infrastructure.   It uses 502,056 Trina Solar polycrystalline silicon panels that are mounted in rows and onto single-axis trackers.  The rows are organized into 75 blocks, and the electricity produced from each block is connected to the electric grid through an inverter built by TMEIC.

In early 2015, SunEdison awarded an EPC contract for the project to Renewable Energy Systems (RES) of Broomfield.   Work at the site began in August and proceeded through the winter months, with most balance of system (BOS) construction activities completed by April 2016.   The panel installation, electrical integration, and acceptance testing proceeded through the summer, enabling the start of commercial operations in September.  The completed facility is operated and maintained by Swinerton Renewable Energy.

Development and ownership history

The project was originated by Community Energy,  which completed many of the initial negotiations such as the grid integration strategy, land leases, and required permits.    SunEdison announced its acquisition of the project in July 2014 concurrent with the results of Xcel's open solicitation/competitive bid process.   In August,  SunEdison announced its strategy to finance the $253 million Comanche project using a novel special purpose vehicle named "First Reserve". As designed with its partner Everstream Capital Management, this funding mechanism - a special type of warehouse - would expand to meet demand from new investors as Comanche (and future projects) moved into construction, thus reducing the need for incremental equity contributions by SunEdison while preserving a first right of call provision for its TerraForm Power yield co.

With all requirements in place, the start of construction was announced in August 2015.   Most BOS work was complete by the time that SunEdison filed for Chapter 11 bankruptcy protection on April 21, 2016.   Nevertheless, work at Comanche and other SunEdison projects continued unabated due to the company's receipt of $300 million in bankruptcy debt financing.  On May 16, 2017 Novatus Energy announced its purchase of the operating Comanche facility, although terms were not disclosed.

Electricity production

See also

 Solar power in Colorado
 List of power stations in Colorado
 San Isabel Solar Energy Center
 Renewable portfolio standard

External links 
 VIDEO: Community Energy Solar - Comanche 
 VIDEO: Swinerton SOLV: Solar O&M Solution

References

Buildings and structures in Pueblo County, Colorado
Photovoltaic power stations in Colorado
Photovoltaic power stations in the United States
Energy infrastructure completed in 2016